Substitution of the heterocycle isoquinoline at the C1 position by a benzyl group provides 1‑benzylisoquinoline, the most widely examined of the numerous benzylisoquinoline structural isomers. The 1-benzylisoquinoline moiety can be identified within numerous compounds of pharmaceutical interest, such as moxaverine; but most notably it is found within the structures of a wide variety of plant natural products, collectively referred to as benzylisoquinoline alkaloids. This class is exemplified in part by the following compounds: papaverine, noscapine, codeine, morphine, apomorphine, berberine, tubocurarine.

Biosynthesis
(S)-Norcoclaurine (higenamine) has been identified as the central 1-benzyl-tetrahydro-isoquinoline precursor from which numerous complex biosynthetic pathways eventually emerge. These pathways collectively lead to the structurally disparate compounds comprising the broad classification of plant natural products referred to as benzylisoquinoline alkaloids (BIA), which have been comprehensively discussed by Hagel. The biosynthesis of (S)-norcoclaurine, which is catalyzed by (S)-norcoclaurine synthase, is accomplished by the stereoselective condensation of dopamine and 4-hydroxyphenylacetaldehyde (4-HPAA); each of these compounds is prepared by multiple enzymatic transformations from L-tyrosine.

It is of interest to note that early studies initially identified norlaudanosoline (tetrahydropapaveroline) as the purported central precursor for the biosynthesis of BIAs. However, more than two decades latter it was finely unequivocally established that (S)-norcoclaurine was the central precursor for the biosynthesis of the structurally diverse BIAs.

Examples of benzylisoquinoline alkaloids

See also
Morphinan
Indole
Indolizidine

References

Benzylisoquinoline biosynthesis by cultivated plant cells and isolated enzymes

Alkaloids